The following is a list of international organization leaders in 2011.

UN organizations

Political and economic organizations

Financial organizations

Sports organizations

Other organizations

See also
List of state leaders in 2011
List of religious leaders in 2011
List of international organization leaders in 2010
List of international organization leaders in 2012

References 

2011
2011 in international relations
Lists of office-holders in 2011